Katschberg Pass (el. ) is a high mountain pass in the Central Eastern Alps in Austria between Rennweg am Katschberg in the state of Carinthia and Sankt Michael im Lungau in Salzburg.

Geography

It connects the Carinthian Katsch Valley in the south with the historic Lungau region of Salzburg (present-day Tamsweg district) and the Mur river in the north, from where the road leads further on to the Radstädter Tauern Pass. The federal-state border between Salzburg and Carinthia runs along the top of the pass. Katschberg also separates the Ankogel Group of the Hohe Tauern range in the west from the Nock Mountains, part of the Gurktal Alps, in the east.

History
Though the pass was probably already known to the Celtic Taurisci and later was part of a Roman Road from Teurnia to Iuvavum (Salzburg), it was first mentioned in a 1459 deed, then at the border between the Duchy of Carinthia and the Archbishopric of Salzburg. Mail was first sent over the pass in 1764.

In 1929, J. Kastner built the first inn at Katschberghöhe. Matthias and Gertrude Bogensperger took over the inn in 1956 and expanded it to a 4-star hotel. These days, there are numerous hotels, holiday resorts and apartments in the region.   
In 1957, the first ski lift to the Tschaneck peak was built.

Tourism
Today, the ski resort 'Schischaukel Katschberg-Aineck' includes 16 lifts that cover  of slopes with 100% snow-making facilities from Tschaneck to Aineck until Sankt Margarethen im Lungau.

Winter & Ski tourism

Ski runs
The longest ski run is the “A1” from the summit of the Aineck Mountain to St. Margarethen, a run of 6 km. The steepest and most difficult runs are from the Aineck to Katschberg valley - the black piste: Diretissima with up to 100% incline gradient at the unpisted first section making it one of the steepest runs in Austria – 3 km, and the Tschaneck "Nord" run (black piste with 55% incline gradient – but also suitable for families – 1.8 km).
For beginners, the platterlift, Minijet and “Königswiesen” chairlift at Katschberg as well as the family run and Branntweiner run at Aineck are perfectly suitable.

Connection lifts

The connection lifts are the 8-person gondola Silverjet 1 from valley station St. Margarethen to Aineck as well as the 6-person Tschaneck cable car from Katschberghöhe to Tschaneck.

Further lifts

Carinthia
The 6-person Gamskogelexpress cable car, the Königswiesen cable car, and the Sonnalm cable car are available at the Carinthian side of the mountain. Furthermore, there is the Aineckbahn cable car as well as three platter and drag lifts.
Salzburg
At the Salzburg side of Katschberg-Aineck, there are three modern gondolas Silverjet 1, Silverjet 2 and the Aineck Gipfelbahn gondola.

Summer tourism

With the development of the ski resort, also summer tourism has been developing. These days, there is a 200-km-wide hiking trail network as well as numerous summer activities and accommodations in the region.

See also
 List of highest paved roads in Europe
 List of mountain passes

References

External links
 Profile on climbbybike.com

Mountain passes of Salzburg (state)
Mountain passes of the Alps
Mountain passes of Carinthia (state)
Lavanttal Alps